Stephen John Masiello Jr. (born September 2, 1977) is an American college basketball coach and a former player. He most recently served as men's head coach at Manhattan College.

Masiello is a native of White Plains, New York. He graduated from Iona Grammar School in 1991 and attended Archbishop Stepinac High School for two years before transferring to the Harvey School in Katonah. Masiello played collegiately as a walk-on at Kentucky for coaches Rick Pitino and Tubby Smith from 1996 to 2000.  Though he rarely played, he was a member of two Final Four teams, including the 1997–98 Wildcats team that won the national championship. Masiello left Kentucky without completing his college degree in communications, despite information to the contrary on his Manhattan College and Louisville website bios.

Following the close of his college career, Masiello got his first coaching job as an administrative assistant at Tulane during the 2000–01 season.  Following a stint as an assistant at Manhattan, he got an opportunity to rejoin his old coach Pitino at Louisville.  Masiello served on Pitino's staff for six years, gaining a reputation as a top assistant coach and strong recruiter.

Manhattan
On April 11, 2011, Masiello was named the 24th head basketball coach at Manhattan College.

On March 25, 2014, Masiello agreed to a deal to become the next head coach at South Florida. However, South Florida later rescinded their offer after it was reported that he had not graduated from the University of Kentucky, as his resume had stated. Masiello was subsequently placed on leave by Manhattan.
It was announced on April 7, 2014, that Masiello will be retained as Manhattan head coach, but is on permanent leave until he gets his undergraduate degree. On May 29, 2014, the University of Kentucky announced that Masiello had completed his required coursework and would receive a degree that August.

Masiello was relieved of duty in October 2022 just weeks before the start of the season. Afterward, Masiello was hired as director of operations for Iona under former Louisville and current Iona head basketball coach, Rick Pitino.

Head coaching record

References

External links
 Manhattan Jaspers profile
 College playing statistics

1977 births
Living people
American men's basketball coaches
American men's basketball players
Basketball coaches from New York (state)
Basketball players from New York (state)
College men's basketball head coaches in the United States
Guards (basketball)
Kentucky Wildcats men's basketball players
Louisville Cardinals men's basketball coaches
Manhattan Jaspers basketball coaches
People who fabricated academic degrees
Sportspeople from Westchester County, New York
Tulane Green Wave men's basketball coaches